Emam Qaleh-ye Olya (also Romanized as Emām Qal‘eh-ye ‘Olyā; also known as Shāhneshīn-e ‘Olyā (Persian: شاه نشين عليا) and Shāhneshīn-e Bālā) is a village in Qaleh Hamam Rural District, Salehabad County, Razavi Khorasan Province, Iran. At the 2006 census, its population was 284, in 65 families.

References 

Populated places in   Torbat-e Jam County